Anaesthetobrium fuscoflavum is a species of beetle in the family Cerambycidae. It was described by Matsushita in 1933. It is known from Taiwan.

References

Desmiphorini
Beetles described in 1933